The Victorian Abortion Law Repeal Association was an Australian pro-choice organization that Beatrice Faust was president of in 1966.

References

Abortion-rights organisations in Australia